John Thomas McCarthy (born December 27, 1939) was the United States Ambassador to Lebanon and Tunisia.

McCarthy holds degrees from Manhattan College and Harvard University. Prior to his appointment as ambassador, he was Deputy Assistant Secretary of State for Public Affairs.

References

1939 births
Ambassadors of the United States to Tunisia
Ambassadors of the United States to Lebanon
Manhattan College alumni
Harvard University alumni
Living people
20th-century American diplomats